Eletica testacea, is a species of blister beetle found in India, Sri Lanka, Laos and Thailand.

Description
Body length is about 35.2 to 28.5 mm. Head is 6.2 to 6.5 mm long and long oval in shape. Vertex strongly elevated. Eyes large, and reniform. Mandibles strongly curved, and very robust. Pronotum blackish and shiny. Elytra costulate, reddish color with black bands at middle. Legs entirely black, where the hind tibiae possess external spur. Tarsal claws are strongly curved. Ventrum blackish with fine, yellowish pubescence. Male has black antennae which are very thick, and serrate. Aedeagus without hooks, but slightly curved at the apex.

References 

Meloidae
Insects of Sri Lanka
Insects of India
Insects described in 1789